Lisgobban may refer to:

Lisgobban, County Roscommon, a townland in County Roscommon, Ireland
Lisgobban, County Tyrone, a townland in County Tyrone, Northern Ireland